Ramona Unified School District is a public school district based in the city of Ramona, in eastern San Diego County, California.

External links
 

Ramona, San Diego County, California
School districts in San Diego County, California